Ekaterina Yevgenyevna Anikeeva (born January 22, 1969, in Moscow) is a Russian water polo player, who won the bronze medal at the 2000 Summer Olympics.

See also
 List of Olympic medalists in water polo (women)

References

External links
 

1969 births
Living people
Russian female water polo players
Olympic water polo players of Russia
Water polo players at the 2000 Summer Olympics
Olympic bronze medalists for Russia
Olympic medalists in water polo
Medalists at the 2000 Summer Olympics